Retrogore is the ninth studio album by Belgium-based death metal band, Aborted. It was released on 22 April 2016 worldwide, through Century Media Records. It is the first Aborted album with guitarist Ian Jekelis, and the last with bassist JB van der Wal.

The first song, "Retrogore", was streamed on 8 March 2016 via YouTube. The song "Termination Redux" previously made an appearance on the band's 2016 EP Termination Redux.

Critical reception
Retrogore received overwhelmingly positive critical reception upon release, with many reviewers praising it to be the best record the band has released to this date.

Chart performance
The album peaked at No. 59 on the Belgian albums chart, making it Aborted's best charting album until the release of TerrorVision. The album remained in the Belgian charts for a total of four weeks.

Track listing

Personnel

Aborted
Sven de Caluwé – vocals
Mendel bij de Leij – guitar
Ian Jekelis – guitar
JB van der Wal – bass
Ken Bedene – drums

Guest musicians
David Davidson (Revocation) – vocals (track 8)
Julien Truchan (Benighted) – vocals (track 3)
Jason Keyser (Origin) – vocals (track 9)
Travis Ryan (Cattle Decapitation) – vocals (track 7)
Alex Karlinsky – samples, keyboards (all tracks)

Production
Kristian "Kohle" Kohlmannslehner – producer, engineer, mixing, mastering
Christopher Lovell – artwork

Charts

References

2016 albums
Aborted (band) albums
Century Media Records albums